Bernard Croisile, neurologist and neuropsychologist, has been the chair of the neuropsychology department at the Neurological Hospital of Lyon, France, since 1992. Croisile is also the chief scientist and co-founder of Happyneuron Inc., a company that sells online brain training programs. Croisile has written several hundred peer-reviewed articles for scientific publications, papers, and book chapters on aging and cognition. He received his M.D. and certification in neurology from Lyon Hospitals and his neurosciences specialty degree and Ph.D. in neuropsychology from University Claude Bernard in Lyon, France.

In 1998, Croisile was the recipient of the Alzheimer's Disease Parke-Davis Award

References

French neurologists
Living people
Year of birth missing (living people)